= List of secretaries-general of the House of Representatives of Indonesia =

This is a list of the secretaries-general of the Indonesian House of Representatives. The secretariat is intended to "support the smooth implementation of the powers and duties of the House."

No.	Photo	Name	Assumed office	Left office	Notes
1		Sumardi	15 February 1950	2 September 1954	(Note: Died in office.)
–		R. Akoep Goelangge (acting)	2 September 1954	10 March 1955	
2		Rusli	10 March 1955	1960	
3		Sumarsono Pringgodiredjo	1960	1962	
4		Djoko Sumardjono	1962	5 July 1969	
5		Sri Hardiman	5 July 1969	27 December 1973	
6		Mudjono	27 December 1973	15 July 1978	
7		Wang Suwandi	15 July 1978	1 March 1989	
8		Sulaksono	1 March 1989	1994	
9		Afif Ma'ruf	1994	1998	
10		Sri Sumaryati	1998	2002	
11		Faisal Djamal	2002	12 May 2008	
12		Nining Indra Saleh	12 May 2008	26 February 2013	
13		Winantuningtyas Titi Swasanany	26 February 2013	23 March 2017	
14		Achmad Djuned	23 March 2017	22 May 2018	
15		Indra Iskandar	22 May 2018	incumbent	

== Bibliography ==
- Tim Penyusun Sejarah (1970). Seperempat Abad Dewan Perwakilan Rakjat Republik Indonesia [A Quarter Century of the House of Representatives of the Republic of Indonesia] (PDF) (in Indonesian). Jakarta: Sekretariat DPR-GR.
- State Secretariat of the Republic of Indonesia (1981). Himpunan Peraturan Negara tentang Kelembagaan Dewan Perwakilan Rakyat (PDF) (in Indonesian). Jakarta.
